Encounter or Encounters may refer to:

Film
Encounter, a 1997 Indian film by Nimmala Shankar
Encounter (2013 film), a Bengali film
Encounter (2018 film), an American sci-fi film
Encounter (2021 film), a British sci-fi film
Encounters, a section of the Berlin International Film Festival
Encounters (film), a 1993 Australian thriller

Music
Encounter!, a 1968 album by Pepper Adams 
Coleman Hawkins Encounters Ben Webster or Encounters, an album by Coleman Hawkins and Ben Webster
Encounter (Mark Holden album) (1977)
Encounter (Michael Stearns album) (1988)
Place Vendôme (Swingle Singers with MJQ album) or Encounter
Encounter (Trio 3 album) (2000)
Encounters (album), a 1984 album by Mal Waldron
Encounters, an album by Sylvan
"Encounter", a 2016 song by Chris Quilala from Split the Sky
 Encounter, a song in the video game Metal Gear Solid

Ships
HMS Encounter (1846)
HMS Encounter (1873), a wooden-screw corvette
HMS Encounter (H10), an E-class destroyer launched in 1934
HMAS Encounter (1902), a Challenger-class protected cruiser
HMAS Encounter (naval base), a former naval depot in South Australia

Television
Encounter (1958 TV series), a 1958 CBC/ABC anthology television series
Encounter (1960 TV program), a Canadian talk show television program 
Encounter (1970 TV program), a Canadian political affairs television program
Encounters (TV series), a 1994 American television series
Encounter (Indian TV series) (2014)
Encounter (South Korean TV series) (2018)

Other uses
Encounter (psychology), an authentic, congruent meeting between individuals
Encounter (magazine), a literary magazine
Encounter Books, a book publisher in the United States, named after the magazine
Encounter (game), an international network of active urban games
Encounter (video game), a 1983 game by Novagen
Encounters (anthology), a 2004 anthology of speculative fiction
Encounter (sculpture), an bronze sculpture by Bruce Beasley

See also
Close encounter, a claimed UFO sighting
The Encounter (disambiguation)
Encounter Bay (disambiguation)
Police encounter
Encounter killings by police, killing in a gun fight with the police in the Indian subcontinent, sometimes an extrajudicial killing
HMS Encounter, a list of ships